Still Explosive is the third studio album by rapper Messy Marv.

Track listing
 Intro
 Make It Crack Then
 Niggaz Gone Hate Me
 Hold Me Down
 Is Real
 Nubian Queen (featuring Keyshia Cole)
 Keep It Gangsta
 Parking Lot Peezy
 Ya Heard That
 I'm a Soldier Boy
 Forever Thug Life
 That's Nothin'
 Real Talk
 Mil Tickets and Big Fishes (featuring Rich the Factor & Rushen Roulet)
 Nubian Queen (Remix) (featuring E-40 & Keyshia Cole)
 Representin' (Outro)

References
 http://www.artistdirect.com/nad/store/artist/album/0,,1092429,00.html
 http://www.cduniverse.com/search/xx/music/pid/1588195/a/Still+Explosive.htm

2001 albums
Messy Marv albums
Gangsta rap albums by American artists